Kolley  may refer to:

Kolley is a German family name originated in England or Ireland. It is written Colley or McColley. Lord Wellington has Colley ancestors. There are more variants like Cowley. In the 18th century Colley is used in the Palatium and around Liege which seems to have mutated to Kollei/y. Than there were Kollei, Kolley, Colley or Kolei in around Ohlau (Olawa) in Poland. Settlers called by Frederick the Second? from around 1748 until 1945 when Silesia was taken over by Poland. Very prominent in the village of Wuerben and a branch to Frankenstein. There is also German Kolley immigration to the USA perhaps researched by somebody else.

Names:
 Abdou Kolley (21st century), Gambian politician
 Kolley Kibber, a fictional character

See also

 Colley (disambiguation)
 Kolei
 Kollei